Kinnerton may refer to:
Higher Kinnerton, Flintshire, Wales
Lower Kinnerton, Cheshire, England
Kinnerton, Powys, Wales